The following article presents a summary of the 1999 football (soccer) season in Paraguay.

First division results

Torneo Apertura
The Apertura tournament was played in a single all-play-all system. At the end, the top eight teams qualified to a playoff stage to determine the Apertura champion.

Apertura playoff stage
The top eight teams qualified to this stage and were given bonus points based on their final standing in the table. Two groups of four teams were made, with the top two of each group advancing to a playoff stage.

Group stage
Group A

Group B

Semifinals

|}

Apertura final

|}

Olimpia wins the Apertura tournament final by aggregate score of 2-0.

Torneo Clausura
The Clausura tournament was played in a single all-play-all system. At the end, the top eight teams qualified to a playoff stage to determine the Clausura champion.

* Presidente Hayes finished in the top eight but their average points over three years forced the team to be relegated so they did not take part of the playoff stage. Cerro Cora took their place instead.

Clausura playoff stage
The top eight teams qualified to this stage and were given bonus points based on their final standing in the table. Two groups of four teams were made, with the top two of each group advancing to a playoff stage. Cerro Cora replaced Presidente Hayes in playoff stage due to Hayes being relegated to the second division.

Group stage
Group A

Group B

Semifinals

|}

Clausura final

|}

Cerro P. wins the Clausura tournament final by aggregate score of 5-1.

National championship game
The national championship game was played between the Apertura and Clausura tournaments winners.

|}

Olimpia declared as national champions by aggregate score of 4-2.

Relegation / Promotion
 Presidente Hayes and Resistencia automatically relegated to the second division after finishing last and second-to-last in the average points table based over a three-year period.
 Universal promoted to the first division by winning the second division tournament.

Qualification to international competitions
Olimpia qualified to the 2000 Copa Libertadores by winning the Torneo Apertura.
Cerro Porteño qualified to the 2000 Copa Libertadores by winning the Torneo Clausura.
The remaining spot for Copa Libertadores was decided in a playoff game between the runners-up of the Apertura (Atl. Colegiales) and Clausura (Cerro Cora). Colegiales won 2-1 and secured a spot for the Copa Libertadores.

Lower divisions results

Paraguayan teams in international competitions
Copa Libertadores 1999:
Cerro Porteño: Semi-finals
Olimpia: Group stage
Copa MERCOSUR 1999:
Olimpia: Quarter-finals
Cerro Porteño: Group stage
Copa CONMEBOL 1999:
San Lorenzo: First round

Paraguay national team
The following table lists all the games played by the Paraguay national football team in the year 1999.

Notes

References
 Paraguay 1999 by Eli Schmerler, Andy Bolander and Juan Pablo Andrés at RSSSF
 Diario ABC Color

 
Seasons in Paraguayan football